The pine flycatcher (Empidonax affinis) is a species of bird in the family Tyrannidae, the tyrant flycatchers.
It is found in the montane tropical and subtropical coniferous forests of Mexico and southwestern Guatemala. A vagrant bird found in the Santa Rita Mountains, Arizona, in late May 2016 is the first record north of Mexico. (An erroneous 2009 record from Choke Canyon State Park in southern Texas was later shown to be a misidentified Least Flycatcher.)

References

Empidonax
Birds of Mexico
Birds of Guatemala
Birds described in 1827
Taxonomy articles created by Polbot
Birds of the Sierra Madre Occidental
Birds of the Sierra Madre Oriental
Birds of the Sierra Madre del Sur
Birds of the Trans-Mexican Volcanic Belt